Aegocera venulia is a moth in the family Noctuidae first described by Pieter Cramer in 1777. It is found in India and Sri Lanka.

Description
Its wingspan is about 33 mm. Forewings of male without costal vesicles. Forewings with longitudinal white streak entire, and with an indenture on its upper edge and a small black spots near its lower edge. A red marginal line is present. Cilia of both wings white.

References

Moths described in 1777
Agaristinae
Moths of Asia
Moths of Sri Lanka